Ambunti Rural LLG is a local-level government (LLG) of East Sepik Province, Papua New Guinea. Various Sepik languages are spoken in the LLG.

Wards
01. Ambunti
02. Bangus (Yelogu language speakers)
03. Waskuk (Kwoma language speakers)
04. Beglam (Kwoma language speakers)
05. Tangujamb (Kwoma language speakers)
06. Singiok
07. Amaki 1
08. Ablatak
09. Waiwos
10. Bu-Ur
11. Warsei
12. Ambuken
13. Tauri
14. Oum 1
15. Oum 2
16. Sanapian (Chenapian language speakers)
17. Hauna (Pei language speakers)
18. Waskuk (Washkuk / Kwoma language speakers)
19. Kupkain
20. Swagap 1 (Sogap / Nggala language speakers)
21. Baku
22. Yessan (Yessan language speakers)
23. Prukunawi
24. Yambun
25. Malu
26. Yerakai (Yerakai language speakers)
27. Garamambu
28. Yauambak
29. Avatip
80. Ambunti Urban

References

Local-level governments of East Sepik Province